Sherman County is a county located in the U.S. state of Texas. As of the 2020 census, its population was 2,782. Its county seat is Stratford. The county was created in 1876 and organized in 1889. It is named for Sidney Sherman, who fought in the Texas Revolution.

Though both Sherman County and Sherman, Texas, are named for the same person, the city of Sherman is located in Grayson County, about 430 miles to the southeast.

Geography

Major highways
  U.S. Highway 54
  U.S. Highway 287
  State Highway 15

Adjacent counties
 Texas County, Oklahoma (north)
 Hansford County (east)
 Moore County (south)
 Dallam County (west)
 Cimarron County, Oklahoma (northwest)
 Hartley County (southwest)
 Hutchinson County (southeast)

Demographics

Note: the US Census treats Hispanic/Latino as an ethnic category. This table excludes Latinos from the racial categories and assigns them to a separate category. Hispanics/Latinos can be of any race.

As of the census of 2000,  3,186 people, 1,124 households, and 865 families resided in the county.  The population density was 4 people per square mile (1/km2).  The 1,275 housing units averaged 1 per square mile (1/km2).  The racial makeup of the county was 82.49% White, 0.53% African American, 0.66% Native American, 0.03% Asian, 14.63% from other races, and 1.66% from two or more races.  About 27.43% of the population was Hispanic or Latino of any race. In terms of ancestry, 20.3% were German, 7.3% were  English, 7.1% were of American, 5.5% were of Irish, 2.6% were of Scottish, and 1.9% were of Dutch.

Of the  1,124 households, 40.70% had children under the age of 18 living with them, 68.00% were married couples living together, 6.00% had a female householder with no husband present, and 23.00% were not families. About 21.50% of all households were made up of individuals, and 10.00% had someone living alone who was 65 years of age or older.  The average household size was 2.76 and the average family size was 3.24.

In the county, the population was distributed as 31.40% under the age of 18, 7.00% from 18 to 24, 26.50% from 25 to 44, 21.50% from 45 to 64, and 13.60% who were 65 years of age or older.  The median age was 34 years. For every 100 females, there were 102.50 males.  For every 100 females age 18 and over, there were 95.70 males.

The median income for a household in the county was $33,179, and for a family was $38,821. Males had a median income of $27,481 versus $21,036 for females. The per capita income for the county was $17,210.  About 11.90% of families and 16.10% of the population were below the poverty line, including 21.90% of those under age 18 and 12.00% of those age 65 or over.

Communities

Cities
 Stratford (county seat)
 Texhoma (divided city with Texhoma, Oklahoma)

Ghost town
 Coldwater

Politics

See also

 List of museums in the Texas Panhandle
 Dry counties
 Recorded Texas Historic Landmarks in Sherman County

References

External links

 Sherman County government’s website
 Sherman County in Handbook of Texas Online at the University of Texas
 Sherman County Profile from the Texas Association of Counties
 Sketch of  Sidney Sherman from A pictorial history of Texas, from the earliest visits of European adventurers, to A.D. 1879, hosted by the Portal to Texas History.

 
1876 establishments in Texas
Populated places established in 1876
Texas Panhandle
Majority-minority counties in Texas